4-Chloro-3-Methylmethcathinone  (4-Cl-3-MMC) is a chemical compound from the substituted cathinone family. It has stimulant effects, and has been sold as a designer drug. It was first identified in Sweden in 2021. It is illegal in Italy and Finland, as well as under generic legislation in various other jurisdictions.

See also 
 3-Methylmethcathinone
 4-Chloromethcathinone
 MFPVP

References 

Cathinones
Designer drugs
Chloroarenes
Norepinephrine-dopamine releasing agents
Secondary amines